Chestnut Hill station may refer to:
 Chestnut Hill East (SEPTA station)
 Chestnut Hill West (SEPTA station)
 Chestnut Hill (MBTA station)